Songbird: Rare Tracks & Forgotten Gems is a 2007 box set of songs personally selected by Emmylou Harris: "I've selected not greatest hits, but personal favorites: that, with a few exceptions-have never appeared on any other compilations, but were important gems in the string of pearls that each album strives to become. Also included are special collaborations, unreleased live and demo tracks, as well as contributions to tribute projects, which I may now gather into this fold.” 

Discs one and two serve as a retrospective of Emmylou's solo career, including at least one song from each of Emmylou's previous studio and live albums (and two cuts from her time with Gram Parsons). Discs three and four consist of collaborations with other performers, tribute album tracks, and unreleased material.  Overall, 13 of the 78 tracks were previously unreleased.  The DVD collects 9 videos filmed between 1975 and 2005, plus a public service announcement for Animal Rescue.

Packaging

The 5 disc set (4 CDs & 1 DVD) are packaged in a multifold cardboard sleeve bound to mimic a photographic album. A 200-page liner notes and biography booklet, liberally graced with photos from throughout Emmylou's career, is also bound to mimic a photographic album.  Both faux miniature photographic albums are housed in a CD sized cardboard slipcase.

Track listing
 previously unreleased material marked with * following song title

Disc One

Disc Two

Disc Three

Disc Four

DVD
"Together Again" – with The Hot Band, featuring James Burton (1975)
"Making Believe" – with The Hot Band, featuring Albert Lee, from the BBC's Old Grey Whistle Test (April 11, 1977)
"Blue Kentucky Girl" – from PBS' Soundstage (1978)
"Satan's Jewel Crown" – from PBS' "Soundstage" (1978)
"Mr. Sandman" – Promotional video (1981)
"I Don't Have To Crawl" – Promotional video (1981)
"I Ain't Living Long Like This" – with Spyboy (1998)
"Love Hurts" – at the Grand Ole Opry, with Elvis Costello (February 17, 2006)
"Imagine" – from CMT's Crossroads (January 4, 2004)
"PSA: Emmylou Harris On Animal Rescue"

Personnel

Emmylou Harris – acoustic guitar, vocals, harmony vocals, 6-string bass, baritone electric guitar
Gram Parsons - vocals on 1-2; guitar on 1-3; background vocals on 1-3
James Burton - lead electric guitar on 1-2; electric guitar on 1-6, 1-8, 1-9, 1-10, 4-8; gut-string guitar on 1-4; dobro on 1-4; rhythm guitar on 3-3
Bernie Leadon - guitar on 1-2; synthesized acoustic guitar bass on 3-2; banjo on 4-7
Herb Pedersen - guitar on 1-2; acoustic guitar on 1-5; background vocals on 1-5, 1-8
Al Perkins - pedal steel on 1-2; banjo on 2-8; harmony vocals on 2-8; dobro on 2-9, 4-2, 4-3, 4-12, 4-13
Byron Berline - mandoline on 1-2, 1-5; fiddle on 1-4, 1-6
Glen D. Hardin - piano on 1-2, 1-6, 1-9, 4-5, 4-8, 4-9; electric piano on 1-4, 1-8, 1-10, 1-16; keyboards on 2-18
Emory Gordy, Jr. - bass on 1-2, 1-6, 1-8, 1-9, 1-10, 1-14, 1-15, 1-16, 1-17, 1-19, 2-1, 3-3, 4-8, 4-9; background vocals on 1-6; Ernie Ball bass on 1-18, 2-5; vocals on 2-4; acoustic bass on 4-6, 4-7; double bass on 4-6
Jock Bartley - electric guitar on 1-3
Neil Flanz - pedal steel on 1-3
Kyle Tullis - bass on 1-3
N.D. Smart III - drums on 1-3
Rick Cunha - acoustic guitar on 1-4
Ray Pohlman - bass on 1-4
Ron Tutt - drums on 1-4
Ben Keith - pedal steel on 1-4
Brian Ahern - high-strung guitar on 1-4; bass on 1-5, 1-7, 1-12, 1-21, finger-style acoustic guitar on 1-8; acoustic guitar on 1-9, 1-10, 1-19, 2-18; percussion on 1-10, 1-13; archtop guitar on 1-14, 1-15, 1-17; Adamas guitar on 1-15; gut-string guitar on 1-18; six-string bass on 1-18; tambourine on 1-18; Ernie Ball bass on 1-19; banjo on 2-18; Earthwood bass on 2-18; electric baritone guitar on 3-3; guitar on 4-8, 4-9
Fayssoux Starling - background vocals on 1-4, 1-5, 1-7, 1-8; duet vocal on 1-10
Amos Garrett - electric guitar on 1-5; lead guitar on 1-16
Bill Payne - piano on 1-5, 1-21, 3-20; electric piano on 1-17; synthesizer on 1-21; organ on 3-3
Nick DeCaro - string arrangement on 1-5, 4-6; accordion on 4-6; strings on 4-7
Hank DeVito - pedal steel on 1-6, 1-8, 1-9, 1-10, 1-13, 1-18, 1-19, 2-1; steel guitar on 4-8, 4-9
Rodney Crowell - rhythm guitar on 1-6; background vocals on 1-6; acoustic guitar on 1-8, 1-16, 1-19; guitar on 4-8, 4-9
John Ware - drums on 1-6, 1-8, 1-9, 1-10, 1-13, 1-19, 1-20, 4-8, 4-9; percussion on 1-17, 1-18
Mike Auldridge - dobro on 1-7; pedal steel on 3-21
John Starling - acoustic guitar on 1-7, 4-13, 4-17; background vocals on 1-7; vocals on 4-2, 4-3; harmony vocals on 4-13
Albert Lee - mandolin on 1-9, 1-14, 1-19, 3-5; electric guitar on 1-17, 2-1; backing vocals on 4-6; acoustic guitar on 4-7; guitar on 4-9
Ricky Skaggs - viola on 1-10; fiddle on 1-10, 1-12, 1-15, 1-19; mandolin on 1-13, 1-14, 1-15, 1-17, 1-18, 2-18; harmony vocals on 1-14, 1-15, 1-19; lead vocals on 1-15; acoustic guitar on 1-15, 1-18
Mickey Raphael - harmonica on 1-8, 1-11, 1-16, 1-18, 4-9
Willie Nelson - duet vocal on 1-11
Sharon White - harmony vocals on 1-12, 1-17, 1-19; background vocals on 1-13
Cheryl White - harmony vocals on 1-12, 1-17, 1-19; background vocals on 1-13
Lincoln Davis Jr - accordion on 1-13
Tony Brown - piano on 1-13; electric piano on 1-19
Mike Bowden - bass on 1-13, 1-20, 2-2
Johnny Cash - harmony vocals on 1-14
Tony Rice - harmony vocals on 1-14; acoustic guitar on 1-14; lead acoustic guitar on 1-17; guitar on 3-21
Mac Rebbenack - piano on 1-16
Lynn Langham - synthesizer on 1-16
Hal Blaine - drums on 1-16
Jerry Douglas - dobro on 1-17, 3-6
Waylon Jennings - harmony vocals on 1-18
Frank Reckard - lead guitar on 1-18, 1-20; mandolin on 2-2
Don Johnson - keyboards on 1-20; harmony vocals on 1-20
Barry Tashian - rhythm guitar on 1-20; duet vocals on 1-20
Steve Fishell - pedal steel on 1-20, 4-1, 2-6; dobro on 2-2
Wayne Goodwin - mandolin on 1-20; tenor sax on 1-20
Jim Horn - recorder on 1-21
Shane Keister - keyboards on 2-1, 2-2, 2-3
Russ Kunkel - drums on 2-1
Buddy Spicher - fiddle on 2-1
Dolly Parton - background vocals on 2-1; vocals on 2-3, 3-4, 3-5, 4-17
Linda Ronstadt - background vocals on 2-1; harmony vocals on 3-2, 3-10; vocals on 2-3, 3-4, 3-5, 4-17
Carl Jackson - acoustic guitar on 2-2, 4-17; vocals on 2-4; baritone vocals on 2-5; lead acoustic guitar on 2-5, 4-2, 4-3, 4-13; harmony vocals on 4-2; duet vocal on 4-3, 4-13
Steve Turner - drums on 2-2, 4-3; percussion on 2-2
Mark O'Connor - fiddle on 2-2, 3-11, 3-15; viola on 2-3, 3-5; acoustic lead guitar on 3-5; mandola on 3-6
Mary Ann Kennedy - harmony vocals on 2-2; vocal on 4-5; mandolin on 4-5
Pam Rose - harmony vocals on 2-2; vocal on 4-5; acoustic guitar on 4-5
Vince Gill - vocals on 2-4; tenor vocals on 2-5; mandolin on 2-5
Richard Bennett - 6-string bass on 2-6; acoustic guitar on 2-7, 4-10, 4-12; mandocello on 2-10; electric guitar on 4-4, 4-11; guitars on 4-16
Carl Marsh - synthesizer on 2-6
David Pomeroy - bass on 2-6, 4-5, 4-15
Billy Thomas - percussion on 2-6
Chris Leuzinger - acoustic guitar on 2-7; electric guitar on 4-10; acoustic slide guitar on 4-11
Bob Wray - bass on 2-7; 4-10
Milton Sledge - drums on 2-7, 4-10; percussion on 2-7
Kenny Malone - field drum on 2-7; drums on 3-7; percussion on 3-7
Bobby Wood - keyboards on 2-7
Liam O'Flynn - uilleann pipes & whistle on 2-7, 3-11
Davy Spillane - uilleann pipes & whistle on 2-7, 3-11
Mary Black - harmony vocals on 2-7; vocals on 3-11
Iris Dement - harmony vocals on 2-7; vocals on 4-15
Delores Keane - harmony vocals on 2-7; vocals on 3-11
Jon Randall Stewart - harmony vocals on 2-8, 2-9, 4-10, 4-11; mandolin on 2-9; acoustic guitar on 4-12
Sam Bush - mandolin on 2-8, 4-3, 4-2, 4-10, 4-11, 4-12, 4-13, 4-15; harmony vocals on 2-8, 2-9; fiddle on 2-9, 4-3, 4-13
Roy Husky, Jr. - upright bass on 2-8, 2-9, 3-6; bass on 3-11, 4-3, 4-12; acoustic bass on 4-17
Larry Atamanuik - drums on 2-8, 2-9, 4-12; harmony vocals on 2-8
Cathy Chiavola - harmony vocals on 2-10
David Hoffner - keyboards on 2-10; Wurlitzer electric piano on 4-12
Joe Loesch - special effects on 2-10
Daniel Lanois - mandolin on 2-11, 2-12; electric guitar on 2-11, 2-12; bass on 2-11; duet vocal on 2-11; acoustic guitar on 2-12; electric orchestra on 2-17; backing vocals on 2-17; guitar on 3-12; basspedals on 3-12
Daryl Johnson - high harmony vocal on 2-11; tom tom on 2-11; vocals on 2-13; djembe on 2-13; bass guitar on 2-13, 2-15, 2-19, 4-1; bass pedals on 2-13; percussion on 2-13, 2-15, 4-1; harmony vocals on 2-15; organ on 3-12
Brian Blade - drums on 2-11
Steve Earle - finger picking acoustic guitar on 2-12; vocal on 3-9; guitar on 3-9; bass on 3-9; mandolin on 3-9; banjo on 3-9; harmonica on 3-9; harmonium on 3-9; Mini-Moog on 3-9; organ on 3-9
Malcolm Burn - piano on 2-12, 2-15, 2-16; synth bass on 2-15; electric guitar on 2-15, 2-16; bass on 2-16; percussion on 2-16; drums on 2-16; Hammond B-2 organ on 2-17, 2-19; backing vocals on 2-17; Fender Rhodes on 2-19
Tony Hall - shaker on 2-12; bass on 2-12, 2-17, 2-19
Larry Mullen, Jr. - hand drum on 2-12; drum kit on 2-12
Julie Miller - harmony vocals on 2-13; backing vocals on 2-19
Brady Blade - vocals on 2-13; drums on 2-13, 2-19; percussion on 2-13, 2-17
Buddy Miller - vocals on 2-13; lead electric guitar on 2-13; 12-string guitar on 2-13; mando guitar on 2-13; acoustic guitar on 2-19; electric guitar on 2-19, 4-1
Ethan Johns - elbow on 2-15, 2-16; acoustic guitar on 2-16; drums on 2-19; Spanish guitar on 3-2; marksaphone on 3-2; percussion on 3-19; baritone guitar on 3-19; guitar on 4-14
Kate McGarrigle - piano on 2-16; harmony vocals on 2-16, 2-18, 3-10; acoustic guitar on 2-18; banjo on 2-18, 3-10; backing vocals on 2-19, 3-2; vocal on 3-8
Kevin Salem - electric guitar on 2-17
Jane Siberry - backing vocals on 2-17
Anna McGarrigle - keyboards on 2-18; accordion on 2-18, 3-10; harmony vocals on 2-18, 3-10; backing vocals on 3-2; vocal on 3-8
Greg Leisz - acoustic guitar on 3-2; pedal steel on 3-18
Wix - accordion on 3-2
Dave Lewis - drums on 3-3
David Campbell - string arrangements on 3-4 
Mark Casstevens - acoustic guitar on 3-4
David Grisman - mandolin on 3-4, 4-17
Alison Krauss - viola on 3-4, fiddle on 4-17
Edgar Meyer - bowed bass on 3-4
David Lindley - autoharp on 3-5
Kenny Edwards - Ferrington acoustic bass on 3-5
Jimmy Ibbotson - harmony vocals on 3-6
Jeff Hanna - guitar on 3-6; harmony vocals on 3-6
Bob Carpenter - accordion on 3-6; harmony vocals on 3-6
Randy Scruggs - guitar on 3-6; acoustic guitar on 4-15; autoharp on 4-15; 5-string dobro on 4-15
Jimmy Fadden - drums on 3-6
Guy Clark - vocals on 3-7; guitar on 3-7
Verlon Thompson - guitar on 3-7
Marty Stuart - mandolin on 3-7
Travis Clark - bass on 3-7
Michele Pepin - vocal on 3-8; bass on 3-8, 3-10; electric guitar on 3-10; dobro on 3-10
Eric "Roscoe" Ambel - guitar on 3-9; vocals on 3-9
Kelley Looney - bass on 3-9
Will Rigby - drums on 3-9; percussion on 3-9
Ken Coomer - drums on 3-9
Patrick Earle - percussion on 3-9
John McColgan - drums on 3-10; percussion on 3-10
Sylvain Clavet - percussion on 3-10
Pat Crowley - accordion on 3-11
Aaron Embry - piano on 3-12
Victor Indrizzo - drums on 3-12
David Rawlings - acoustic guitar on 3-13; harmony vocals on 3-13
Gillian Welch - bass on 3-13; harmony vocals on 3-13
Joey Miskulin - accordion on 3-13
Patty Mitchell - harmony vocal on 3-16
Kenny Vaughn - electric guitar on 3-16
Pat Bergeson - tremolo guitar on 3-16; harmonica on 3-16
Scott Neubert - acoustic guitar on 3-16
Johnny Cox - pedal steel on 3-16
Chris Nole - piano on 3-16
Rob Price - bass on 3-16
Bob Mummert - drums on 3-16
Paul Kennerley - synthesizer on 3-17; electric guitar on 3-17; backing vocals on 4-6
Sheryl Crow - vocals on 3-18; acoustic guitar on 3-18
Jeff Trott - electric guitar on 3-18
Tim Smith - bass on 3-18; baritone guitar on 3-18
Greg Williams - drums on 3-18
Chrissie Hynde - vocals on 3-19
Adam Seymour - guitar on 3-19
Andy Hobson - bass on 3-19
Martin Chambers - drums on 3-19
Benmont Tench - organ on 3-19
Beck Hansen - vocal on 3-20; acoustic guitar on 3-20
Smokey Hormel - guitar on 3-20
Jay Dee Maness - pedal steel on 3-20
Justin Meldal-Johnsen - bass on 3-20
Joey Waronker - drums on 3-20
Gabe Witcher - fiddle on 3-20
Jonathan Edwards - guitar on 3-21; vocal on 3-21
John Duffey - mandolin on 3-21
Peter Bonta - piano on 3-21
Lou Reid - electric bass on 3-21; vocal on 3-21
Robbie Magruder - drums on 3-21
Patty Griffin - vocals on 4-1; harmony vocals on 4-14
Martie Maguire - mandolin on 4-1
Emily Robison - Weissenborn on 4-1
Glenn Worf - bass on 4-2, 4-4, 4-11, 4-13, 4-16
Paul McInerney - drums on 4-2, 4-13
Mark Knopfler - electric guitar on 4-4; vocals on 4-16; guitars on 4-16
Guy Fletcher - acoustic guitar on 4-4; keyboards on 4-16
Mike Henderson - mandolin on 4-4
Geraint Watkins - Hammond B-3 organ on 4-4
Chad Cromwell - drums on 4-4, 4-16
Levon Helm - harmony vocals on 4-6, 4-7; backing vocals on 4-6; drums on 4-7
Tim Gorman - backing vocals on 4-6; piano on 4-7
Jody Payne - backing vocals on 4-6
Donivan Cowart - backing vocals on 4-6
George Jones - vocal on 4-9
John Jarvis - piano on 4-10; Wurlitzer electric piano on 4-11
Harry Stinson - drums on 4-11, 4-15
Mary Chapin Carpenter - harmony vocals on 4-14
Dan Dugmore - acoustic guitar on 4-16
Jim Cox - keyboards on 4-16
Danny Cummings - drums on 4-16
Glen Duncan - fiddle on 4-16; mandolin on 4-16
Jim Keltner - drums on 4-17

Chart performance

References

Albums produced by Tony Brown (record producer)
Emmylou Harris compilation albums
2007 compilation albums
Rhino Records compilation albums